Megactenodes is a genus of beetles in the family Buprestidae, containing the following species:

 Megactenodes aenea (Thomson, 1878)
 Megactenodes capitosa Thery, 1934
 Megactenodes chrysifrons (Quedenfeldt, 1886)
 Megactenodes cupriventris Kerremans, 1912
 Megactenodes ebenina (Quedenfeldt, 1886)
 Megactenodes levior (Quedenfeldt, 1886)
 Megactenodes raffrayi Thery, 1930
 Megactenodes reticulata (Klug, 1855)
 Megactenodes tenuecostata (Quedenfeldt, 1886)
 Megactenodes unicolor (Gory & Laporte, 1837)
 Megactenodes westermanni (Gory & Laporte, 1838)

References

Buprestidae genera